Pansak Ketwattha is a Thai football coach. In 2009, he coached Thailand Premier League side Pattaya United F.C. His father is Somjet Ketwattha who was club chairman of Coke-Bangpra until the takeover by Pattaya United. Pansak lead Coke-Bangpra to promotion to the Premier League after coming second in Division One in 2007

Clubs managed

Pattaya United - 2007–2009

Honours

2007 Thai Division One League Runner Up with Coke-Bangpra

References

Living people
Pansak Ketwattha
1956 births